Beauvoir may refer to:

People
Jean Beauvoir, American musician
Richard Benyon De Beauvoir (1769–1854), British Member of Parliament
Roger de Beauvoir (1806–1866), pen name of French writer, Eugène Auguste Roger de Bully
Simone de Beauvoir (1908–1986), French author, philosopher, and feminist
Hélène de Beauvoir (1910–2001), French painter and sister of Simone de Beauvoir

Places

France
Beauvoir, Manche
Beauvoir-de-Marc
Beauvoir-en-Royans
Beauvoir, Seine-et-Marne
Beauvoir-Wavans
Saint-Hilaire-de-Beauvoir
Beaurevoir (formerly Beauvoir), Aisne

United Kingdom
De Beauvoir (ward), a ward in the London Borough of Hackney
De Beauvoir Town, a district in North London, England

Other uses
Beauvoir (Biloxi, Mississippi), post-American Civil War home of Jefferson Davis, President of the Confederate States
Pontikokastro, a castle in southern Greece, known as Beauvoir by the Frankish Crusaders
Beauvoir, an elementary school in Washington, D.C.; see National Cathedral School

See also
Passerelle Simone-de-Beauvoir, a pedestrian bridge across the Seine River in Paris, France